
Source:

Before U.S. jurisdiction

Under U.S. jurisdiction (territorial)

After statehood (federal) 

As a matter of jurisdictional law, this execution did not take place in Michigan per se because it was carried out by the United States government at a US government-owned facility, located in but not subject to the State of Michigan's jurisdiction.

See also
 Capital punishment in Michigan
 Capital punishment in the United States

Notes 

Michigan
Legal history of Michigan
Michigan
Michigan law
 
Michigan-related lists